Saw Sala was a Burmese royal title.

It may mean:
 Saw Sala of Toungoo:  Vicereine of Toungoo (r. 1317−24)
 Saw Sala of Sagaing:  Queen of Pinya (r. 1364)

Burmese royal titles